Edward Shaw  (born 1864) was a Welsh international footballer. He was part of the Wales national football team between 1882 and 1884, playing 3 matches and scoring 2 goals. He played his first match on 25  February 1882 against Ireland and his last match on 29 March 1884 against Scotland. He scored in the match at Wrexham's Racecourse Ground on 9 February 1884 against Ireland. Wales ran out comfortable victors with a score of 6–0 with two goals of Shaw.

His nephew was the poet Wilfred Owen.

See also
 List of Wales international footballers (alphabetical)
 List of Wales international footballers born outside Wales

References

1864 births
Welsh footballers
Wales international footballers
Place of birth missing
Year of death missing
Association footballers not categorized by position